Franklin Township is one of fifteen townships in Fillmore County, Nebraska, United States. The population was 189 at the 2020 census.

The village of Ohiowa lies within the township.

References

External links
City-Data.com

Townships in Fillmore County, Nebraska
Townships in Nebraska